Statistics of the Scottish Football League in season 1898–99.

Overview
Rangers were champions of the Scottish Division One.

Kilmarnock won the Scottish Division Two for the second season in a row.

Scottish League Division One

Scottish League Division Two

See also
1898–99 in Scottish football

References

 
1898-99